Foothill Farms is a census-designated place (CDP) and unincorporated community in Sacramento County, California, USA.  It is part of the Sacramento–Arden-Arcade–Roseville Metropolitan Statistical Area.  The population was 33,121 at the 2010 census, up from 17,426 at the 2000 census. Foothill Farms is part of the greater North Highlands-Foothill Farms community, and comprises the zip codes 95841 and 95842. Susan Ual services as President of the New Foothill Farms Community Association  while Michael Baker services as the President of the Old Foothill Farms Community Association
 www.oldfoothillfarms.org

Geography
Foothill Farms is located at  (38.6817, -121.3478).

Demographics

2010
At the 2010 census Foothill Farms had a population of 33,121. The racial makeup of Foothill Farms was 21,249 (64.2%) White, 4,002 (12.8
%) African American, 357 (1.1%) Native American, 1,731 (5.2%) Asian, 208 (0.6%) Pacific Islander, 3,362 (10.2%) from other races, and 2,586 (7.8%) from two or more races.  Hispanic or Latino of any race were 7,579 persons (22.9%).

The census reported that 33,072 people (99.9% of the population) lived in households, 33 (0.1%) lived in non-institutionalized group quarters, and 16 (0%) were institutionalized.

There were 11,726 households, 4,768 (40.7%) had children under the age of 18 living in them, 5,073 (43.3%) were opposite-sex married couples living together, 2,276 (19.4%) had a female householder with no husband present, 869 (7.4%) had a male householder with no wife present.  There were 1,056 (9.0%) unmarried opposite-sex partnerships, and 88 (0.8%) same-sex married couples or partnerships. 2,575 households (22.0%) were one person and 667 (5.7%) had someone living alone who was 65 or older. The average household size was 2.82.  There were 8,218 families (70.1% of households); the average family size was 3.29.

The age distribution was 9,219 people (27.8%) under the age of 18, 3,803 people (11.5%) aged 18 to 24, 9,592 people (29.0%) aged 25 to 44, 7,642 people (23.1%) aged 45 to 64, and 2,865 people (8.7%) who were 65 or older.  The median age was 31.1 years. For every 100 females, there were 95.3 males.  For every 100 females age 18 and over, there were 90.6 males.

There were 12,607 housing units at an average density of 3,003.1 per square mile, of the occupied units 6,297 (53.7%) were owner-occupied and 5,429 (46.3%) were rented. The homeowner vacancy rate was 2.6%; the rental vacancy rate was 7.2%.  16,582 people (50.1% of the population) lived in owner-occupied housing units and 16,490 people (49.8%) lived in rental housing units.

2000
At the 2000 census there were 17,426 people, 6,563 households, and 4,462 families in the CDP. The racial makeup of the CDP was 69.79% White, 12.37% African American, 1.33% Native American, 4.34% Asian, 0.53% Pacific Islander, 5.88% from other races, and 5.76% from two or more races. Hispanic or Latino of any race were 14.48%.

Of the 6,563 households 36.3% had children under the age of 18 living with them, 42.1% were married couples living together, 18.7% had a female householder with no husband present, and 32.0% were non-families. 24.2% of households were one person and 6.6% were one person aged 65 or older.  The average household size was 2.65 and the average family size was 3.13.

The age distribution was 29.1% under the age of 18, 11.6% from 18 to 24, 30.3% from 25 to 44, 19.1% from 45 to 64, and 10.0% 65 or older.  The median age was 31 years. For every 100 females, there were 93.7 males.  For every 100 females age 18 and over, there were 89.7 males.

The median household income was $38,049 and the median family income  was $41,582. Males had a median income of $31,032 versus $26,414 for females. The per capita income for the CDP was $16,358.  About 9.9% of families and 12.8% of the population were below the poverty line, including 17.9% of those under age 18 and 3.9% of those age 65 or over.

Politics

In the United States House of Representatives, Foothill Farms is in California's 6th congressional district.

Both Old and New Foothill Farms are represented by independent Rich Desmond on the Sacramento County Board of Supervisors

Twin Rivers Unified School District Area 1 (Old Foothill Farms) is represented by Nonpartisan Michael Baker. Twin River Unified School District Area 2 (New Foothill Farms) is represented by Nonpartisan Michelle Revis.

Adjacent areas

References

Census-designated places in Sacramento County, California
Census-designated places in California